Hauglibakken is an abandoned ski jumping hill located in Brunkeberg, Norway opened in 1868.

History 
Sondre Norheim set the second men's ski jumping world record in history and only one on this hill with 19.5 meters (64 ft) on 8 March 1868.

Originally, distance was measured in ells, an old Norwegian unit. One Norwegian ell (alen) equaled 62.75 centimetres. The first recorded ski jump was originally measured at 31 ells (19.5 metres).

In 1986, Morgedal IL club, built two new K20 and K40 hills, called Hauglandsbakken, on the exact same spot as the old historic hill. They are now also abandoned.

Ski jumping world record

Note

References

External links
Hauglibakken / Hauglandsbakken skisprungschanzen.com

Ski jumping venues in Norway
1868 establishments in Norway
Sport in Vestfold og Telemark
Kviteseid